William Ashford (1746–1824) was an English painter.

William Ashford may also refer to:

William Ashford (politician) (1874–1925), Australian politician
William Ashford (rugby union), player in 1897 Home Nations Championship
William Ashford of Ashford v Thornton